Arthur Edward McDonogh (c.1810 – 26 October 1852) was a New Zealand policeman, police magistrate, militia officer and roading supervisor. He was born in Ireland in c.1810.

References

1810s births
1852 deaths
New Zealand police officers
Irish emigrants to New Zealand (before 1923)